Elsie Green (born 27 January 1908, date of death unknown) was an English athlete who competed in the 1934 British Empire Games.

At the 1934 Empire Games she won the bronze medal in the 80 metre hurdles event.

External links
Profile at TOPS in athletics

1908 births
Year of death missing
English female hurdlers
British female hurdlers
Athletes (track and field) at the 1934 British Empire Games
Commonwealth Games bronze medallists for England
Commonwealth Games medallists in athletics
Medallists at the 1934 British Empire Games